Sonny is a 1922 American silent drama film directed by Henry King and starring Richard Barthelmess, Margaret Seddon, and Pauline Garon.

Cast
 Richard Barthelmess as Sonny Crosby / Joe 
 Margaret Seddon as Mrs. Crosby 
 Pauline Garon as Florence Crosby 
 Lucy Fox as Madge Craig 
 Herbert Grimwood as Harper Craig 
 Patterson Dial as Alicia 
 Fred Nicholls as Summers 
 James Tarbell as James 
 Margaret Elizabeth Falconer as Crosby Twin 
 Virginia Magee as Crosby Twin

References

Bibliography
 Monaco, James. The Encyclopedia of Film. Perigee Books, 1991.

External links

1922 films
1922 drama films
Silent American drama films
Films directed by Henry King
American silent feature films
1920s English-language films
First National Pictures films
American black-and-white films
1920s American films